The 2016 Atlantic Coast Conference women's soccer season was the 28th season of women's varsity soccer in the conference.

The Virginia Cavaliers are the defending regular season champions.  The Florida State Seminoles are the defending ACC tournament Champions.

Changes from 2015 

There were no coaching changes from 2015 to 2016.

Teams

Stadiums and locations 

1.  Georgia Tech does not sponsor women's soccer

Personnel

Regular season

Rankings

NSCAA

Top Drawer Soccer

Postseason

ACC tournament

NCAA tournament

All-ACC awards and teams

Draft picks

The ACC had 10 total players selected in the 2017 NWSL College Draft.  There was 1 player selected in the first round, 2 players selected in the second round, 3 players selected in the third round, and 4 players selected in the fourth round.

References 

 
2016 NCAA Division I women's soccer season